The 46th Newfoundland and Labrador House of Assembly was summoned to meet on March 10, 2008, its members having been sworn in and elected its speaker on November 1, 2007, and was dissolved on September 19, 2011. The Progressive Conservative government led by Danny Williams was re-elected with a landslide victory. The Liberal and NDP opposition was nearly wiped off the electoral map. Williams resigned in 2010 and his Deputy Premier Kathy Dunderdale was sworn in as the Premier.

Members (MHAs)

Standings changes since 2007 general election

By-elections in the 46th General Assembly

|Progressive Conservative
|Kevin Parsons
|align="right"|2,865
|align="right"|68.97
|align="right"|
|-

|New Democratic Party
|Kathleen Connors
|align="right"|972
|align="right"|23.40
|align="right"|
|-

|Liberal
|Tonia Power-Mercer
|align="right"|317
|align="right"|7.63
|align="right"|
|-
!align="left" colspan=3|Total
!align="right"|4,154
!align="right"|
!align="right"|

|Progressive Conservative
|Kevin Pollard
|align="right"|1,979
|align="right"|55.90
|align="right"|
|-

|Liberal
|Shaun Lane
|align="right"|1,245
|align="right"|35.17
|align="right"|
|-

|New Democratic Party
|Tim Howse
|align="right"|316
|align="right"|8.97
|align="right"|
|-
!align="left" colspan=3|Total
!align="right"|3,540
!align="right"|
!align="right"|

}

|Liberal
|Marshall Dean
|align="right"|1,925
|align="right"|47.58%
|align="right"|

|NDP
|Dale Colbourne
|align="right"|321
|align="right"|7.93%
|align="right"|
|}

}

|Liberal
|John Baird
|align="right"|1663
|align="right"|38.2%
|align="right"|+21.32%

|NDP
|Robin Brentnall
|align="right"|297
|align="right"|6.8%
|align="right"|-1.54%
|}

}

|NDP
|Brian Nolan
|align="right"|374
|align="right"|11.16
|align="right"|+2.91

|Liberal
|Shane Kennedy
|align="right"|238
|align="right"|7.10
|align="right"|-1.61
|}

}

|NDP
|George Murphy
|align="right"|1043
|align="right"|26.20%
|align="right"|+15.96%

|Liberal
|Joy Buckle
|align="right"|299
|align="right"|7.51%
|align="right"|-10.46%
|}

}

|Liberal
|Mark Watton
|align="right"|1097
|align="right"|33.06%
|align="right"|

|NDP
|Rosie Myers
|align="right"|112
|align="right"|3.38%
|align="right"|
|}

References

External links

46